Martin Arnold Schmidt (born January 1960) is the 19th President of Rensselaer Polytechnic Institute. Prior to this role, Schmidt was Provost at the Massachusetts Institute of Technology (MIT) from 2014 to 2022.

Education
Schmidt earned his BS from Rensselaer Polytechnic Institute in 1981 and PhD from MIT in 1988.

Career
In 1988, Schmidt became a faculty member of the MIT Electrical Engineering and Computer Science Department. From 1999 to 2006, He was the director of the Microsystems Technology Laboratories at MIT. In 2016, he was named the Ray and Maria Stata Professor at MIT. Schmidt became an associate provost at MIT from 2008 and assumed the role of provost in 2014.

He is a recipient of the National Science Foundation Presidential Young Investigator Award in 1991. He was named as a fellow of the Institute of Electrical and Electronics Engineers (IEEE) in 2004 for contributions to design and fabrication of microelectromechanical systems.

His teaching and research work is in the field of micro- and nanofabrication technologies for sensors, actuators, and MEMS. Schmidt has co-founded or co-invented the core technology of seven start-up companies.

References

External links
 MIT group website

1960 births
Living people
20th-century American engineers
21st-century American engineers
American electrical engineers
Fellow Members of the IEEE
Rensselaer Polytechnic Institute alumni
MIT School of Engineering alumni
MIT Lincoln Laboratory people
Massachusetts Institute of Technology faculty
Massachusetts Institute of Technology provosts